Dorota Andraka (born November 26, 1961) is a Polish-American educator, and the current President of the Polish Supplementary School Council of America.

Biography 
Dorota Andraka became the Deputy President of the Polish Supplementary School Council of America in 2003. Since 2005, she has been the president of the organization on the East Coast. During her term she organized conventions for the Polish supplementary schools teachers and parents committees with professors from Maria Curie-Skłodowska University, Jagiellonian University of Kraków, University of Warsaw, Pedagogical University of Kraków and the Teacher's Development Center of Lublin.

In 2007, as the neighborhood's Grand Marshall, Dorota Andraka led the Greenpoint community along New York's famous Fifth Avenue during the annual Pulaski Day Parade. Andraka was appointed to the Program Experts Council by the Minister of National Education in 2008, and two years later to the Polonia Education Council. The Consul General of the Republic of Poland in New York in 2010 nominated her to work in the Committee of the "Outstanding Poles of the USA" competition. Since 2010 she has also worked in the Polish-American Education Council.

Andraka is a co-organizer of the Polish Regents Exams, as well as the Certification Program for Polish as a second language regulated and supervised by the Ministry of National Education of Poland, which takes place at Columbia University in New York.

She has received the Gold Cross of Merit of the Republic of Poland and the Medal of the National Education Commission. 

In 2017, Andraka was hosted by the First Lady of the Republic of Poland at the Presidential Palace in Warsaw, Poland to discuss Polish education in America and the role of the Polish Supplementary School Council of America within the Polish-American community in the United States.

In 2019, Andraka received the Officer's Cross of the Order of Merit of the Republic of Poland from the President of Poland, Andrzej Duda, during the president's visit to New Britain, Connecticut.

Personal life 
Dorota Andraka currently lives in New York State with her husband Marek. Together they have two sons, Sebastian, and Damian.

References

External links 
 Polish Supplementary School Council of America
 Polish American Chamber of Commerce Eastern USA

1961 births
Polish educators
Living people
Polish emigrants to the United States
People from Greenpoint, Brooklyn